Sweden held its 2014 European Parliament election on the 25 May 2014. the same week as the other 27 countries held their elections.

Results

Results by county
The Swedish results are counted by county only, since the seats are shared on a national basis, rendering eight fewer counting areas than in Riksdag elections.

Percentage share

By votes

Municipal results

Blekinge

Dalarna

Gotland

Gävleborg

Halland

Jämtland

Jönköping

Kalmar

Kronoberg

Norrbotten

Skåne

Stockholm

Södermanland

Uppsala

Värmland

Västerbotten

Västernorrland

Västmanland

Västra Götaland

Örebro

Östergötland

References

2014 results
2014 elections in Sweden